Island Creek is a stream in Talbot County, Maryland, in the United States.

Island Creek was named from an island which was located near its mouth until it washed away in the 19th century.

See also
List of rivers of Maryland

References

Rivers of Talbot County, Maryland
Rivers of Maryland